1997 was a tough year for the Waikato Chiefs rugby team in the Super 12 Tournament. They won 4 of their 11 games and finished 10th overall on the table, this year the team was coached by Brad Meurant and captain by Ian Jones.

Standing

Coaching staff

Results

Squad

The Chiefs Squad for the 1997 Super 12 Season were:

References

External links
Official Chiefs website
Official Super Rugby website 
Official Facebook page

1997
1997 in New Zealand rugby union
1997 Super 12 season by team